Poliopastea chrysotarsia is a moth of the family Erebidae. It was described by George Hampson in 1898. It is found in Panama.

References

Poliopastea
Moths described in 1898